Distal myopathy  is a group of rare genetic disorders that cause muscle damage and weakness, predominantly in the hands and/or feet. Mutation of many different genes can be causative. Many types involve dysferlin.

Signs and symptoms
All of the different types affect different regions of the extremities and can show up as early as 5 years of age to as late as 50 years old. Distal myopathy has slow progress therefore the patient may not know that they have it until they are in their late 40s or 50s.

Miyoshi myopathy affects the posterior muscles of the lower leg, more so than the anterior muscles of the lower leg.

Cause

The cause of this myopathy is very hard to determine because it can be a mutation in any of at least eight genes and not all are known yet. These mutations can be inherited from one parent, autosomal dominant, or from both parents, autosomal recessive. There are eight known types of distal myopathy.

Types

Diagnosis
In terms of diagnosis, Vocal cord and pharyngeal distal myopathy should be assessed via serum CK levels, as well as muscle biopsy of the individual suspected of being afflicted with this condition

Management
As of 2011, no disease modifying treatments are known. Foot drop can be managed with ankle-foot orthoses or surgical tendon transfer, in which the tibialis posterior muscle is repurposed to function as a tibialis anterior muscle. In select types of distal myopathy, evaluation of the heart may be indicated. Scoliosis and contractures can be surgically managed.

References

Further reading

External links 

Muscular dystrophy